Two destroyers of the Imperial Japanese Navy were named Minazuki or Minatsuki  :

 , a  launched in 1906, converted to a minesweeper in 1924 and renamed W-10 in 1928 before being stricken in 1930
 , a  launched in 1926 and sunk in 1944

Imperial Japanese Navy ship names
Japanese Navy ship names